Journal of Chemical Theory and Computation is a peer-reviewed scientific journal, established in 2005 by the American Chemical Society. It is indexed in Chemical Abstracts Service (CAS), Scopus, British Library, and Web of Science. The current editor-in-chief is Laura Gagliardi. Currently as of the year 2022, JCTC has 18 volumes.

Scope
Much of the JCTC reports on new theories, methods and applications of quantum chemical knowledge, such as electronic structure, molecular mechanics and statistical mechanics. Research of computational applications such as ab initio quantum mechanics, Monte Carlo simulations and solvation model are discussed among others. It is stated that "the Journal favors submissions that include advances in theory or methodology with applications to compelling problems".

History
The first issue of JCTC was published in 2005 as a bimonthly journal with 133 articles published in the first volume. In 2008, JCTC increased their output to become a monthly publication, producing 12 issues per year. The journal came about when Jorgensen noticed that although theory and computation could be found in many journals, the field did not have a dedicated journal. In year 2008, JCTC took professor Ursula Rothlisberger from the Swiss Federal Institute of Technology as their associate editor. In the year 2009, the editorial team was further expanded with the addition of Professor Gustavo Scuseria from Rice University.

Statistics 
JCTC is ranked number 4 highest in the list of "Physical and Theoretical Chemistry" journals SCImago Journal Rank. JCTC has a weighted rank indicator (SJR) of 2,481 as of the year 2014. To give perspective, the popular multidisciplinary journal Nature (journal) has an SJR factor of 17,313. The journal had an average of 65.73 references per document in 2014. In 2020, the journal had a total of 41,591 citations and an impact factor of 6.006.

See also

 Physical Chemistry Chemical Physics
 Journal of Chemical Physics
 Computational and Theoretical Chemistry (formerly known as THEOCHEM)
 Journal of Computational Chemistry
 Annual Review of Physical Chemistry
 International Journal of Quantum Chemistry

References

American Chemical Society academic journals
Monthly journals
English-language journals
Publications established in 2005
Computational chemistry
Quantum chemistry
Theoretical chemistry